Asturian Renewal Union (URAS) is a regionalist political party from Asturias, Spain, founded in December 1998 by Sergio Marqués, after leaving the People's Party (PP) when he was President of the Principality of Asturias.

History
After being founded in 1998 by people who left PP and Asturianists, URAS contested the Asturian parliamentary election, 1999 achieving only three seats in the General Junta.

For the 2007 election, URAS took part in a coalition with Partíu Asturianista called Asturianist Union. Sergio Marqués left the presidency of the party after the election, being replaced by Javier López Alonso.

Election results

1 Joint list with Asturianist Party.2 Only took part in the Western district.

References

External links
Official website

Political parties in Asturias
Political parties established in 1998